"Deals with Our Devils" is the seventh episode of the fourth season of the American television series Agents of S.H.I.E.L.D., based on the Marvel Comics organization S.H.I.E.L.D. (Strategic Homeland Intervention, Enforcement, and Logistics Division), revolving around the character of Phil Coulson and his allies, who are trapped between dimensions. It is set in the Marvel Cinematic Universe (MCU), sharing continuity with the films of the franchise. The episode was written by DJ Doyle, and directed by Jesse Bochco.

Clark Gregg reprises his role as Coulson from the film series, and is joined by series regulars Ming-Na Wen, Chloe Bennet, Iain De Caestecker, Elizabeth Henstridge, Henry Simmons, and John Hannah.

"Deals with Our Devils" originally aired on ABC on November 29, 2016, and according to Nielsen Media Research, was watched by 4.63 million viewers within a week of its release.

Plot 

Coulson, Fitz and Robbie are trapped out of sync with reality, unable to interact with the real world, with no-one else able to see, hear or touch them. They are being drawn to another dimension, which Robbie describes as Hell, revealing that the Ghost Rider spirit has been there before. Killing several agents using his new powers, Morrow escapes, while the Ghost Rider spirit, unwilling to return to 'Hell', abandons Robbie and instead possesses Mack, just as he learns Morrow was allied with the Chinese Watchdogs, having recruited them to retrieve the ghost scientists and find the Darkhold. Mack hunts down the remaining Chinese gang members, and Daisy pursues him, unknowingly accompanied by Robbie, who convinces the spirit to return to him and help him exact revenge on Morrow, in exchange for Robbie continuing to serve as the spirit's host afterwards.

May decides to use the Darkhold to rescue Coulson, Fitz and Robbie, and enlists Radcliffe to read the Darkhold, but he finds the contents are too overwhelming for the human brain to perceive. AIDA suggests she reads it instead, revealing her android nature to May (and Coulson), and with the magical knowledge she learns from the book, she builds a machine that opens a dimensional portal, through which Coulson, Fitz and Robbie return.

Meanwhile, Simmons frees Vijay from his Terrigen cocoon by touching it, at which point Nadeer immediately has her removed. Upon returning to the Playground she reunites with Fitz, who learned of the deal Mace made with Nadeer while out of sync. In an end tag, AIDA secretly begins experimenting with her new knowledge from the Darkhold, creating an artificial brain.

Production 

In November 2016, Marvel revealed that the seventh episode of the season would be titled "Deals with Our Devils", to be written by DJ Doyle, with Jesse Bochco directing. Main cast members Clark Gregg as Phil Coulson, Ming-Na Wen as Melinda May, Chloe Bennet as Daisy Johnson / Quake, Iain De Caestecker as Leo Fitz, Elizabeth Henstridge as Jemma Simmons, Henry Simmons as Alphonso "Mack" MacKenzie, and John Hannah as Holden Radcliffe were confirmed to be starring in the episode.

Also revealed was the guest cast for the episode, including Jason O'Mara as Director Jeffrey Mace, Gabriel Luna as Robbie Reyes, Mallory Jansen as Aida, Manish Dayal as man, Alexander Wraith as Agent Anderson, Lorenzo James Henrie as Gabe Reyes, Maximilian Osinski as Agent Davis, Patrick Cavanaugh as Burrows, Jose Zuniga as Eli Morrow, Blaise Miller as Agent Nathanson, Arnell Powell as scientist, Lance Broadway as Tac Team Leader and David An as Zhi. O'Mara, Luna, Jansen, Wraith, Henrie, Osinski, Cavanaugh, Zuniga, and Miller reprise their roles from earlier in the series.

Release 
"Deals with Our Devils" was first aired in the United States on ABC on November 29, 2016. It began streaming on Netflix, along with the rest of the fourth season, on June 15, 2017.

Reception

Ratings 
In the United States the episode received a 0.8/3 percent share among adults between the ages of 18 and 49, meaning that it was seen by 0.8 percent of all households, and 3 percent of all of those watching television at the time of the broadcast. It was watched by 2.41 million viewers. Within a week of its release, "Deals with Our Devils" had been watched by 4.63 million U.S. viewers, above the season average of 4.22 million.

Accolades 
The episode was nominated for best Dialogue/ADR in Television – Short Form at the 64th Golden Reel Awards.

References

External links 
"Deals with Our Devils" at ABC

Agents of S.H.I.E.L.D. (season 4) episodes
2016 American television episodes